The 2020–21 Everton Football Club season was the club's 118th season in existence and the club's 67th consecutive season in the top flight of English football. In addition to the domestic league, Everton participated in this season's editions of the FA Cup and the EFL Cup.

Kits

Transfers

Transfers in

Loans in

Transfers out

Loans out

Pre-season and friendlies

Competitions

Overview

Premier League

League table

Results summary

Results by matchday

Matches
The league fixtures were announced on 20 August 2020.

FA Cup

The third round draw was made on 30 November, with Premier League and EFL Championship clubs all entering the competition. The draw for the fourth and fifth round were made on 11 January, conducted by Peter Crouch.

EFL Cup

The draw for both the second and third round were confirmed on September 6, live on Sky Sports by Phil Babb. The fourth round draw was conducted on 17 September 2020 by Laura Woods and Lee Hendrie live on Sky Sports.

Squad

Current squad

Out on loan

Statistics

Appearances and goals

|-
! colspan=14 style=background:#dcdcdc; text-align:center| Goalkeepers

|-
! colspan=14 style=background:#dcdcdc; text-align:center| Defenders

|-
! colspan=14 style=background:#dcdcdc; text-align:center| Midfielders

|-
! colspan=14 style=background:#dcdcdc; text-align:center| Forwards

|-
! colspan=14 style=background:#dcdcdc; text-align:center| Players transferred/loaned out during the season

|-

Goalscorers

{| class="wikitable sortable" style="text-align:center;"
|-
!"width:35px;"|
!"width:35px;"|
!"width:35px;"|
!"width:200px;"|Player
!"width:75px;"|Premier League
!"width:75px;"|FA Cup
!"width:75px;"|League Cup
!"width:75px;"|Total
|-
|rowspan=1| 1 || FW || 9 || align=left|  || 16 || 2 || 3 || 21
|-
|rowspan=1| 2 || FW || 7 || align=left|  || 7 || 3 || 3 || 13
|-
|rowspan=1| 3 || MF || 10 || align=left|  || 6 || 1 || 1 || 8
|-
|rowspan=1| 4 || MF || 19 || align=left|  || 6 || 0 || 0 || 6
|-
|rowspan=1| 5 || DF || 5 || align=left| Michael Keane || 3 || 0 || 1 || 4
|-
|rowspan=3| 6 || DF || 13 || align=left|  || 2 || 1 || 0 || 3
|-
| MF || 16 || align=left|  || 2 || 1 || 0 || 3
|-
| MF || 20 || align=left| Bernard || 1 || 1 || 1 || 3
|-
|rowspan=2| 9 || FW || 27 || align=left|  || 0 || 0 || 2 || 2
|-
| MF || 17 || align=left|  || 1 || 0 || 1 || 2
|-
|rowspan=2| 11 || DF || 4 || align=left|  || 1 || 0 || 0 || 1
|-
| FW || 14 || align=left|  || 0 || 1 || 0 || 1
|-
!colspan="4"|Total || 46 || 10 || 12 || 68
|-

Assists

{| class="wikitable sortable" style="text-align:center;"
|-
!"width:35px;"|
!"width:35px;"|
!"width:35px;"|
!"width:200px;"|Player
!"width:75px;"|Premier League
!"width:75px;"|FA Cup
!"width:75px;"|League Cup
!"width:75px;"|Total
|-
| rowspan=1 |1 || MF || 10 || align=left|  || 5 || 3 || 2 || 10
|-
| rowspan=1 |2 || MF || 19 || align=left|  || 4 || 3 || 1 || 8
|-
| rowspan=1 |3 ||DF || 12 || align=left|  || 7 || 0 || 0 || 7
|-
| rowspan=5| 4 || FW || 7 || align=left|  || 3 || 0 || 0 || 3
|-
| MF || 17 || align=left|  || 2 || 0 || 1 || 3
|-
| FW || 24 || align=left|  || 0 || 1 || 2 || 3
|-
| MF || 16 || align=left|  || 3 || 0 || 0 || 3
|-
| DF || 23 || align=left|  || 3 || 0 || 0 || 3
|-
|rowspan=4| 9 || MF || 21 || align=left|  || 1 || 1 || 0 || 2
|-
| DF || 5 || align=left|  || 1 || 0 || 1 || 2
|-
| FW || 9 || align=left|  || 1 || 1 || 0 || 2
|-
| DF || 22 || align=left|  || 2 || 0 || 0 || 2
|-
|rowspan=3| 13 || MF || 26 || align=left|  || 1 || 0 || 0 || 1
|-
| MF || 20 || align=left| Bernard || 0 || 0 || 1 || 1
|-
| DF || 18 || align=left|  || 0 || 0 || 1 || 1
|-
!colspan="4"|Total || 33 || 9 || 9 || 51
|-

Clean sheets

{| class="wikitable sortable" style="text-align:center;"
|-
!"width:35px;"|
!"width:35px;"|
!"width:35px;"|
!"width:200px;"|Player
!"width:75px;"|Premier League
!"width:75px;"|FA Cup
!"width:75px;"|League Cup
!"width:75px;"|Total
|-
|rowspan=1| 1 || GK || 1 || align=left|  || 10 || 0 || 0 || 10
|-
|rowspan=1| 2 || GK || 33 || align=left|  || 2 || 1 || 0 || 3
|-
|rowspan=1| 3 || GK || 31 || align=left|  || 0 || 0 || 1 || 1
|-
!colspan="4"|Total || 12 || 1 || 1 || 14
|-

Disciplinary record

{|class="wikitable sortable" style="text-align: center;"
|-
!rowspan="2" style="width:50px;"|Rank
!rowspan="2" style="width:50px;"|Position
!rowspan="2" style="width:180px;"|Name
!colspan="2"|Premier League
!colspan="2"|FA Cup
!colspan="2"|League Cup
!colspan="2"|Total
|-
!style="width:30px;"|
!style="width:30px;"|
!style="width:30px;"|
!style="width:30px;"|
!style="width:30px;"|
!style="width:30px;"|
!style="width:30px;"|
!style="width:30px;"|
|-
|rowspan=1| 1 || DF ||align=left| Mason Holgate
| 9 || 0

| 0 || 0

| 0 || 0

! 9 !! 0
|-
|rowspan=1| 2 || MF ||align=left| Allan

| 6 || 0

| 1 || 0

| 0 || 0

! 7 !! 0
|-
|rowspan=2| 3 || MF ||align=left| Abdoulaye Doucouré

| 6 || 0

| 0 || 0

| 0 || 0

! 6 !! 0
|-
| FW ||align=left| Richarlison

| 4 || 1

| 1 || 0

| 0 || 0

! 5 !! 1
|-
|rowspan=3| 5 || DF ||align=left| Ben Godfrey

| 3 || 0

| 1 || 0

| 0 || 0

! 4 !! 0
|-
| MF ||align=left| André Gomes

| 3 || 0

| 1 || 0

| 0 || 0

! 4 !! 0
|-
| DF ||align=left| Lucas Digne

| 2 || 1

| 1 || 0

| 0 || 0

! 3 !! 1
|-
|rowspan=4| 8 || FW ||align=left| Dominic Calvert-Lewin

| 3 || 0

| 0 || 0

| 0 || 0

! 3 !! 0
|-
| DF ||align=left| Yerry Mina

| 2 || 0

| 1 || 0

| 0 || 0

! 3 !! 0
|-
| DF ||align=left| Michael Keane

| 3 || 0

| 0 || 0

| 0 || 0

! 3 !! 0
|-
| MF ||align=left| James Rodríguez

| 3 || 0

| 0 || 0

| 0 || 0

! 3 !! 0
|-
|rowspan=4| 12 || FW ||align=left| Bernard

| 2 || 0

| 0 || 0

| 0 || 0

! 2 !! 0
|-
| MF ||align=left| Tom Davies

| 2 || 0

| 0 || 0

| 0 || 0

! 2 !! 0
|-
| MF ||align=left| Fabian Delph

| 1 || 0

| 0 || 0

| 1 || 0

! 2 !! 0
|-
| MF ||align=left| Gylfi Sigurðsson

| 1 || 0

| 1 || 0

| 0 || 0

! 2 !! 0
|-
|rowspan=4| 16 || DF ||align=left| Niels Nkounkou

| 1 || 0

| 0 || 0

| 0 || 0

! 1 !! 0
|-
| FW ||align=left| Cenk Tosun

| 1 || 0

| 0 || 0

| 0 || 0

! 1 !! 0
|-
| GK ||align=left| Jordan Pickford

| 1 || 0

| 0 || 0

| 0 || 0

! 1 !! 0
|-
| GK ||align=left| Robin Olsen

| 1 || 0

| 0 || 0

| 0 || 0

! 1 !! 0
|-

|-
!colspan=3|Total!!53!!2!!7!!0!!1!!0!!61!!2

Notes

References

External links

Everton F.C. seasons
Everton F.C.